This article is an incomplete list of female scholars of Islam.  A traditionally-trained female scholar is referred to as ʿālimah or Shaykha. The inclusion of women in university settings has increased the presence of women scholars and allowed for ideas that challenge traditional perspectives.

7th century
Fatimah, daughter of Islamic prophet Muhammad.
Aisha bint Abu Bakr
Zaynab bint Ali
Hafsa bint Umar
Umm Darda as Sughra
Umm Hakim
Al-Shifa' bint Abdullah
Hafsa bint Sirin 
Umm Salamah
A'isha bint Talhah
Umm Kulthum bint Abi Bakr, Famous Tabi'un and a notable hadith narrator
Na'ila bint al-Furafisa wife of Uthman and a notable hadith narrator
Habeeba Husain
Umm al-Darda
Sakina bint Husayn

8th century 
Fatimah bint Musa
Sayyida Nafisa
Fatima al-Batayahiyyah
Sumayyah bint Khayyat
Amrah bint Abdur Rahman
Fatima bint Mundhir
Rabia Basri
Atika bint Yazid

9th century

Fatima al-Fihri

10th century
Amat al-Wahid
Lubna of Cordoba

11th century 
Karima al-Marwaziyya

12th century
Fatima al Samaraqandi
Taqiyya Umm Ali bint Ghaith ibn Ali al-Armanazi
Fakhr-un-Nisa Shuhdah also known as Shaykhah Shuhdah, or Shuhdah al-Baghdadiyyah

13th century
Zaynab bint ʿUmar al-Kindī
Zaynab bint al-Kamal

14th century
Sitt al-Wuzara' al-Tanukhiyyah
Sitt al-Qudat
Sitt al-'Arab
Sitt al-'Ajam

16th Century

A'isha al-Ba'uniyya

17th century
Zeb-un-Nisa, Mughal princess
Zinat-un-Nissa, Mughal princess, contributor to the Hanafi lexicon Fatawa-e-Alamgiri.
Jahanara Begum

18th century
Fatima al-Fudayliya, also known as al-Shaykha al-Fudayliya.

19th century
 Nana Asma’u bint Shehu Usman bin Fodiyo
 Sultan Shah Jahan, Begum of Bhopal

20th century
Aisha Abd al-Rahman
Zainab al Ghazali
Munira al-Qubaysi
Maryam Jameelah
Lady Amin
Hāshimīyah al-Tujjar
Iftikhār al-Tujjar
Zīnah al-Sādāt Humāyūnī
Muhammadi Begum
Fatima al-Kabbaj
Du Shuzhen
Eva de Vitray-Meyerovitch
Amina al-Sadr
Rahmah el Yunusiyah

21st century
Asifa Quraishi
Asma Afsaruddin
Azizah al-Hibri
Celene Ibrahim
Farhat Hashmi
Ingrid Mattson
Laleh Bakhtiar
Maria Ulfah
Merryl Wyn Davies
Riffat Hassan
Siti Chamamah Soeratno
Siti Noordjannah Djohantini
Zailan Moris
Siti Musdah Mulia
Asma Lamrabet
Maria Massi Dakake 
Sachiko Murata
Amina Wadud
Hidayet Şefkatli Tuksal
Fatima Mernissi
Nahid Angha
Aisha Bewley
Amina Inloes
Zohreh Sefati
Tahera Qutbuddin
Mohja Kahf
Asma Barlas
Mai Yamani
Ziba Mir-Hosseini
Gwendolyn Zoharah Simmons
Halima Krausen
Aminah McCloud
Kecia Ali
Mona Abul-Fadl
Cemalnur Sargut
Claude Addas
Marcia Hermansen
Sa'diyya Shaikh
Zainab Alwani
Salwa El-Awa
Rebecca Masterton
Tahereh Saffarzadeh
Olfa Youssef
Bahar Davary
Rania Awaad
 Abla al-Kahlawi
 Aisha Gray Henry
 Aysha Hidayatullah
 Debra Majeed
 Suad Salih
 Aisha Lemu

References

Lists of scholars and academics
Lists of theologians and religious studies scholars
Islam and women
 
Women scholars of Islam
Lists of women
Islam-related lists